Ji Guobiao (1 March 1932 – 5 September 2019) was a Chinese chemical engineer and an academician of the Chinese Academy of Engineering (CAE). He was a pioneer of chemical fiber engineering technology in China.

Early life and education
Ji was born in Wuxi, Jiangsu, in March 1932. He studied at Donglin Academy and Furen High School. After the liberation of Shanghai in 1949, he was accepted to Shanghai Jiao Tong University, where he majored in the Department of Industrial Management and Department of Textile Dyeing and Chemical Industry. In 1951, due to the adjustment of the faculty, he became a new transfer student at East China Institute of Textile Science and Technology (now Donghua University). During his university years, he joined the New Democratic Youth League.

Career
After university, he was assigned to Qingdao Printing and Dyeing Plant. During his work, he taught himself the professional knowledge of chemical fibers. He joined the Communist Party of China in 1954. That same year, he was sent abroad to study at the expense of the government. After returning to China he became director of the Technical Room of Baoding Chemical Fiber Factory. In the autumn of 1958, he followed chemist Hou Debang to Japan to study fertilizer and fibre production technology. In 1963, he was transferred to Nanjing Chemical Fiber Plant as deputy chief engineer. In 1965, he helped found the Lanzhou Chemical Fiber Plant. He was appointed deputy chief engineer after studying synthetic fiber production technology in the United Kingdom. During the Cultural Revolution, he was denounced as a "reactionary" and was brought to be persecuted. In 1978, he helped found Yizheng Chemical Fiber, serving as its deputy commander and chief engineer. In 1980 he was appointed director of the Department of Chemical Fiber of the Ministry of Textile Industry. He was promoted to vice-minister in 1984. In 1994 he was elected an academician of the Chinese Academy of Engineering (CAE). In December 2003, Donghua University established the Institute of Modern Textiles, Ji became its first dean.

Death
He died of laryngeal cancer in Beijing, on 5 September 2019.

Selected papers

Awards
 2004 5th Guanghua Engineering Science and Technology Award.

References

1932 births
2019 deaths
Scientists from Wuxi
Shanghai Jiao Tong University alumni
Donghua University alumni
Chinese chemical engineers
Chemists from Jiangsu
Members of the Chinese Academy of Engineering
Deaths from laryngeal cancer
Deaths from cancer in the People's Republic of China
20th-century Chinese engineers
Chinese university and college faculty deans
21st-century Chinese engineers
20th-century chemists
21st-century chemists